Love Is Love is a 1990 Hong Kong romantic comedy film directed by Tony Leung Siu Hung and written by Tut-hei Tang and Kwong Kim Yip. The film stars Stephen Chow, Suki Kwan, and Sandra Ng. The film premiered in Hong Kong on 15 February 1990.

Plot
Shi Jinshui and Wu Daidi were raised in the countryside and are childhood sweethearts, but Wu Daidi's father is against their marriage. They elope from their hometown to begin a new life in the city. After a marital squabble, Wu Daidi goes missing and Shi Jinshui leaves for Singapore with his superior.

Cast
 Stephen Chow as Shi Jinshui.
 Sandra Ng as Wu Daidi.
 Suki Kwan as Nancy, Shi Jinshui's superior.
 Shing Fui-On as Wu Daidi's father.
 Pauline Kwan
 Fung Woo
 Peter Lai as Mr Lai

Release
The film was released in Hong Kong on 15 February 1990.

References

External links
 
 
 

Mandarin-language films
Hong Kong romantic comedy films
1990 romantic comedy films
1990 films
1990s Hong Kong films